Ursula Schwaller (born 26 June 1976) is a Swiss para-cyclist, who won two bronze medals at the 2012 Summer Paralympics.

Career
Ursula Schwaller was born on 26 June 1976. In 2002, she had an accident while mountain trekking. Her resulting spinal injury caused her to become paraplegic. She was already active in sports, but following the injury she decided to take up para-sports instead. For example, she took up cycling using a handcycle. Schwaller set herself the objective of competing at the 2008 Summer Paralympics in Beijing, China, as part of the Swiss team. She was chosen, and finished fourth in the women's road time trial H1–2. Schwaller was less successful in the road race, where she finished in ninth place.

At the 2012 Summer Paralympics, she won the bronze medal in the women's road time trial H1–2 despite riding with a thumb injury restricting her in the second half of the race. Along with fellow para-cyclists Jean-Marc Berset and Heinz Frei, they also took the bronze medal in the team mixed relay, marking the 11th medal of the Games for Switzerland. She was also the first woman to compete using a handbike, which required special permission for her to take part.

Personal life
Outside of sports, Schwaller works as an architect.

References

External links

Living people
1976 births
Paralympic athletes of Switzerland
Paralympic bronze medalists for Switzerland
Cyclists at the 2008 Summer Paralympics
Cyclists at the 2012 Summer Paralympics
Swiss female cyclists
Swiss architects
Medalists at the 2012 Summer Paralympics
Paralympic medalists in cycling